Helen Cecelia Black, née Spottiswoode (1838 – 8 February 1906) was an English journalist, best known for the series of interviews with women writers published in book form in 1893 as Notable Women Authors of the Day.

Life
Helen Spottiswoode was born in Bengal, India, the daughter of Arthur Cole Spottiswoode and Jessy Eliza Loveday. In 1856 she married Thomas Black, a captain and company manager for P&O. She founded St Mary’s Cottage Hospital, a charity hospital specializing in leg ailments, in Southampton in 1872. After her husband's death in 1879, she moved to London and worked as a journalist for periodicals including the Lady’s Pictorial, Womanhood, Black and White, The Sketch and Queen. Her friends included Sarah Grand and Marie Corelli.

Works
 Notable women authors of the day; biographical sketches, 1893
 Pen, pencil, baton and mask; biographical sketches, 1896
 From Deal to South Africa, 1901

References

1838 births
1906 deaths
19th-century British journalists
English women journalists
Victorian women writers
Victorian writers
Celebrity biographers